Bernadette or Bernadeta Nemphombe Kunambi (born 2 June 1934) was a Tanzanian politician. She was National General Secretary of the YWCA, Chair of the Tanganyika Council of Women, and a Member of Parliament.

Life
Bernadette Kunambi was born in Morogoro. She was educated at Mhonda Girls School from 1945 to 1948.

She married Patrick Kunambi (1916-2011), a Chief and TANU co-founder who was best friends with Julius Nyerere.

A Roman Catholic, Kunambi participated in the 1961 East Frican Lay Apostolate Meeting hosted by Bishop Blomjous at his Social Training Centre in Nyegezi. In 1969 she participated in the Seminar Study Year, a program to consider the Catholic Church in Tanzania in the light of Vatican II.

In 1969 Julius Nyerere appointed Kunambi, who had previously been working as a teacher, as Area Commissioner for Kilosa District.

In 1980 Kunambi criticized the church for its structural inequality and the ambiguity of its stance on women:

Works
 'The Place of Women in the Christian Community', in Alyward Shorter (ed.) African Christian Spirituality, London: Chapman 1978, pp. 11–20

References

1934 births
Year of death missing
20th-century Tanzanian women politicians
20th-century Tanzanian politicians
People from Morogoro Region